The 1976 Paris Open singles tournament took place at the  Palais omnisports de Paris-Bercy from October 25. Tom Okker was the defending champion, but lost in the quarter-finals to Jaime Fillol.

Eddie Dibbs won in the final 5–7, 6–4, 6–4, 7–6, against Fillol.

Seeds
A champion seed is indicated in bold text while text in italics indicates the round in which that seed was eliminated.

  Harold Solomon (second round)
  Eddie Dibbs (champion)
  Tom Okker (quarterfinals)
  Stan Smith (semifinals)
  Jaime Fillol (final)
  François Jauffret (first round)
  Paolo Bertolucci (quarterfinals)
  Raymond Moore (first round)

Draw

 NB: The Semifinals and Final were the best of 5 sets while all other rounds were the best of 3 sets.

Final

Section 1

Section 2

External links
 1976 Paris Open draw

Singles